The Coordinating Minister for Infrastructure was an appointment in the Cabinet of Singapore. The only person to hold the post, between 2015 and 2020, was Khaw Boon Wan.

List of Coordinating Ministers for Infrastructure

References

2015 establishments in Singapore
2020 disestablishments in Singapore
Infrastructure